Alim Industries Limited is an agricultural machinery manufacturer based in Sylhet, Bangladesh.

Both the largest and oldest agricultural equipment maker in the country, the company was originally founded in 1990. Having initially only associated with the tea processing industry in Sylhet, it later expanded to include the manufacture of general farming machinery, specialising in tillers, seeders and power threshers among others. At present, it exports its products throughout Bangladesh as well as delivering services internationally.

References

Agriculture companies of Bangladesh
Privately held companies of Bangladesh
Agriculture companies established in 1990
Manufacturing companies established in 1990
1990 establishments in Bangladesh